National Route 440 is a national highway of Japan connecting Matsuyama, Ehime and Yusuhara, Kōchi in Japan and has a total length of 96.2 km (59.78 mi).

References

National highways in Japan
Roads in Ehime Prefecture
Roads in Kōchi Prefecture